Aurelius (c. 740 – 774) was the King of Asturias from 768 to his death.

Born in León, he was the son of Fruela of Cantabria (son of Peter of Cantabria); nephew of Alfonso I of Asturias; and a cousin of his predecessor, Fruela the Cruel. His brother, Bermudo I, later reigned as king 789 – 791.

Aurelius was chosen as king by the Asturian nobility after Fruela assassinated his brother and was in turn assassinated. He is believed to have been crowned in Sama. His seems to have been a relatively quiet and peaceful reign, attested by the near-absence of mention of his reign in the medieval chronicles. The only event of his reign narrated in the chronicles was a rebellion of serfs, which Aurelius put down. The location of the uprising is unknown, but it is the first recorded instance of anti-seignorial revolt in the history of the Iberian Peninsula. It is believed that, according to the custom of the times, he negotiated peace with the Muslims who dominated the lands to his south by an exchange of brides, which according to legend led to the place-name El Entrego, nowadays the heart of the municipality of San Martín del Rey Aurelio.

It would appear that his principal residence and the effective capital of Asturias during his reign was the municipality of San Martín del Rey Aurelio, then part of Langreo. Having reigned six years, Aurelius died there of natural causes in the year 774. The chronicles of the era make no mention of Aurelius having a wife or children. He was succeeded by his cousin-in-law, Silo, husband of Alfonso I's daughter Adosinda.

Burial place 
Historians disagree about the disposition of Aurelius's remains. The medieval Asturian Chronicles disagree with one another. Some say that he was entombed near where he lived in the Valley of Langreo, in the Church of San Martín de Tours in San Martín del Rey Aurelio, where there is a tomb engraved "Rey Aurelio". The Estoria de España or Primera Crónica General, written in the 13th century during the reign of Alfonso X of Castile, says that Aurelius' remains were entombed in the municipality of Cangas de Onís. Nonetheless, historian Esteban de Garibay states that Aurelius was entombed next to his father Fruela of Cantabria, in the no-longer-existent church of San Miguel in Yanguas, a municipality of the Province of Soria.

Notes

References

 Gran Enciclopedia Asturiana (1981) Editor: Silverio Cañada 

8th-century Asturian monarchs
Beni Alfons
740s births
Year of birth uncertain
774 deaths
Burials in Spain